Layla Kayleigh is a British-American TV personality, actress and philanthropist. She used to host The Feed segment of G4's Attack of the Show! and co-hosted MTV's America's Best Dance Crew where she was the backstage correspondent. She also hosted the MTV reunion shows such as Teen Mom and Teen Wolf. She has been featured in several magazines including Maxim magazine to promote her projects and the shows she was hosting.
Layla was voted as one of the most beautiful women in the world by Askmen.com and their readers.

Early life
Kayleigh lived in west London. Her birth name is Zara, but she urged her parents to call her by her middle name Layla after the Derek and the Dominos song.  When Kayleigh was 12, her single mother travelled to America in a bid to get US citizenship for them, but Layla Kayleigh opted to stay behind. She "never told a soul" about being alone for fear that social services would come for her.

Layla attended St.Marylebone school for girls, a Christian school based in Bakers Street.
Layla skipped two grades in the English school system and graduated younger than her classmates . She majored in Psychology with a minor in English Literature  and graduated with honours. She also attended Sylvia Young Theatre School for drama and dance.

On 11 September 2008, Kayleigh became a naturalised United States citizen.

Television career
In addition to once hosting MTV2 in Britain and ABC's football halftime show, Kayleigh was once a correspondent for Al Gore's Current TV but was fired after doing an interview and photoshoot with Maxim Magazine. She has appeared on the MTV show Punk'd. She was the main host of "The Feed" segment of Attack of the Show! on G4, as well as shortened versions of "The Feed" during the network's commercial breaks. Kayleigh has been on The Best Damn Sports Show Period on Fox Sports Net, and also reporting on all the entertainment/sports news on The Insider. Kayleigh was also a guest on the Fox News Channel show Red Eye w/ Greg Gutfeld.

Kayleigh is a co-host on America's Best Dance Crew on MTV as their on the road correspondent looking for talent in the different cities. The show, which features Mario Lopez as host premiered on 26 January 2008 with a live casting special and began its first season on 7 February 2008 with Kayleigh as backstage correspondent interviewing the bottom two crews. Season 2 of America's Best Dance Crew started on 19 June on MTV. Season 3 of America's Best Dance Crew premiered on 15 January 2009 on MTV.

On 16 March 2009, episode of Attack of the Show!, Kayleigh announced that she would be leaving G4 due to her pregnancy and going on an indefinite hiatus to be a stay at home mother. On 7 and 27 May 2010, Kayleigh appeared as a member of the Great American Panel on Hannity. She was a correspondent for the TV Guide Network. In April 2012 Layla began hosting MTV special reunion shows, Teen Mom and Teen Wolf interviewing the cast, and speaking about the episodes that had been aired.

She was listed 33rd and 88th on AskMen.com's top 99 women in 2008 and 2011 edition, respectively. She recently appeared in lingerie for a PETA ad campaign protesting the use of animals in product-testing experiments photographed by celebrity photographer Nick Saglimbeni.

In 2014 Kayleigh became a weekly correspondent on Vh1's Big Morning Buzz Live discussing pop culture and current events from around the world as part of a round table discussion. The show was cancelled in August 2015. Kayleigh married actor Chris Warren on May 23, 2019.  They currently live in Los Angeles and share a child a son.  Kayleigh had a daughter from a previous marriage.

References

External links
 

1986 births
Living people
Television personalities from London
English emigrants to the United States
American television personalities
American women television personalities